Yan Shipeng (Chinese: 阎世鹏; Pinyin: Yán Shìpéng, born 8 September 1987 in Dalian) is a Chinese footballer.

Club career
Yan started his professional football career in 2005 when he was promoted to Chinese Super League side Dalian Shide's first team. He was loaned out to Hong Kong First Division League side Citizen along with Wang Xuanhong at the beginning of the 2007/08 season. On 16 September 2007, he made his debut in a 4–0 away victory against Bulova Rangers, coming on as a substitute for Márcio Bambú in the 60th minute. After playing 10 league matches for Citizen, he was called back by Dalian Shide for the 2008 Chinese Super League campaign in January 2008.

Yan eventually failed to establish himself within the first team and was put on the transfer list at the end of 2008 season. He was linked with Shenyang Dongjin and Jiangsu Sainty between 2009 and 2010 but could not receive a contract after trial. Without a professional football club, he returned to his hometown and trained with amateur football team Dalian Longjuanfeng to maintain his fitness. 

Yan joined China League Two side Chongqing FC in 2011. He played 20 matches in the 2011 season, making an impression within the team as Chongqing FC won promotion to the second tier at the end of the season. In the  final which Chongqing FC lost to Harbin Yiteng 6–5 in the penalty shootout, he lost a penalty in the last round. He made 21 appearances and scored a goal in the 2012 league season, knowing by the nickname "Maicon of Chongqing" by local people.

Yan transferred to Super League club Changchun Yatai on 23 February 2013. On 10 July 2013, he made his debut for Changchun in the fourth round of 2013 Chinese FA Cup which Changchun lost to Guizhou Renhe 1–0 at Guiyang Olympic Sports Center. In July 2017, Yan was loaned to China League Two club Shaanxi Chang'an Athletic until 31 December 2017.

Career statistics 
Statistics accurate as of match played 31 December 2020.

References

External links
 

Living people
1987 births
Chinese footballers
Footballers from Dalian
Citizen AA players
Dalian Shide F.C. players
Changchun Yatai F.C. players
Shaanxi Chang'an Athletic F.C. players
Chengdu Better City F.C. players
Expatriate footballers in Hong Kong
Hong Kong First Division League players
Chinese Super League players
China League One players
China League Two players
Association football defenders